The Azione Cattolica Italiana, or Azione Cattolica (Catholic Action) for short, is a widespread Roman Catholic lay association in Italy.

History

In Italy in 1905, Azione Cattolica was established as a non-political lay organization under the direct control of bishops. It was established by Pope Pius X after an earlier similar organization, Opera dei Congressi was disbanded in 1904 by the same pope because many of its members were siding with modernism. The set of events which brought to the foundation of the Azione Cattolica  was critical in the excommunication of modernism in 1907 and a prelude of it. The organization was established as a non-political one because the modernists used Catholic lay organizations to promote a political agenda of siding with Italian parties of the left (even of the extreme as per standards of the time). 
One of the first main leaders of the Azione Cattolica was count Ottorino Gentiloni.

In 1909 count Gentiloni was appointed by Pope Pius X also as head of UECI, a political Catholic organization, and in such capacity he co-authored in 1912 with Giovanni Giolitti the Patto Gentiloni which won the Italian elections in 1913.

In the thirties the original strongly anti-modernist stance of the organization started changing.

Since the organization was forbidden by the Vatican to participate in politics, it was not opposed by the fascist regime, unlike the Partito Popolare. Vatican support for Catholic Action resulted in hundreds of thousands of Catholics withdrawing from the Partito Popolare Italiano, and joining the apolitical Catholic Action – causing the Catholic Party's final collapse.

Other associations related to Azione Cattolica 
Movimento Studenti di Azione Cattolica (MSAC)
Movimento Lavoratori di Azione Cattolica (MLAC)
Movimento di impegno educativo di Azione Cattolica
Movimento ecclesiale di impegno culturale (MEIC)
Italian Catholic Federation of University Students (FUCI)
Centro Sportivo Italiano (CSI)

References

Further reading
 O'Brien, Albert C. "Italian Youth in Conflict: Catholic Action and Fascist Italy, 1929-1931." Catholic Historical Review (1982): 625-635. in JSTOR
 Poggi, Gianfranco.  Catholic Action in Italy (Stanford University Press, 1967)

External links
 NON ABBIAMO BISOGNO (On Catholic Action in Italy), Pius XI, 1931
 Azione Cattolica Italiana Official Website
 Forum of Catholic Action - From Zenit.org

Catholic lay organisations
Catholic Church in Italy
Political organisations based in Italy